The men's 5000 metres at the 2015 Southeast Asian Games was held in National Stadium, Singapore. The track and field events took place on June 9.

Schedule
All times are (UTC+08:00)

Records 

The following new record were set during this competition.

Results 
Legend
SB — Seasonal Best
PB — Personal Best
GR — Games Record

References

Athletics at the 2015 Southeast Asian Games